Dương Thị Thục (1868–1944), was an empress dowager of Vietnam between 1923–1933. She was the mother of emperor Khải Định of the Nguyễn dynasty. She was the concubine of emperor Đồng Khánh. She had never been empress consort, but was given the title of empress dowager in her capacity as the mother of the emperor.

References

 Truyện kể về các Vương phi, Hoàng hậu nhà Nguyễn - Thi Long, Nhà xuất bản Đà Nẵng.

Nguyễn dynasty empresses dowager
1868 births
1944 deaths